James Patrick Gallery (born  September 15, 1961) is a former American football Kicker in the National Football League who played for the St. Louis Cardinals, Cincinnati Bengals and Minnesota Vikings. He played college football at University of Minnesota.

References 

1961 births
Living people
American football placekickers
St. Louis Cardinals (football) players
Cincinnati Bengals players
Minnesota Vikings players
Minnesota Golden Gophers football players
National Football League replacement players